Sodium methanethiolate or sodium thiomethoxide (CH3SNa, MeSNa) is the sodium conjugate base of methanethiol. This compound is commercially available as a white solid. It is a powerful nucleophile that can be used to prepare methylthioethers. Its hydrolysis in moist air produces methanethiol, which has a low odor threshold and a noxious fecal smell.

References 

Thiolates
Organic sodium salts